David Sanger is the name of:
 David Sanger (organist) (1947–2010)
 David Sanger (drummer)
 David E. Sanger (born 1960), White House correspondent for The New York Times